Geraku, Garaku may refer to:
 Geraku, Fuman, Gilan Province
 Garaku, Rasht, Gilan Province
 Geraku, Mazandaran
 Garaku Toshusai, a pen name of Takashi Nagasaki
 Garaku Utagawa, a fictional character in Ayakashi Triangle